"I've Been Wrong Before" is a song co-written and recorded by American country music artist Deborah Allen.  It was released in December 1983 as the second single from her album Cheat the Night.  The song reached #2 on the Billboard Hot Country Singles chart in April 1984 and #1 on the RPM Country Tracks chart in Canada.  Allen wrote the song with Rafe Van Hoy and Don Cook.

Chart performance

References

1983 singles
1983 songs
Deborah Allen songs
Songs written by Deborah Allen
Songs written by Don Cook
RCA Records singles
Songs written by Rafe Van Hoy